The 2014–15 season was Gabala's tenth season overall and ninth competing in the Azerbaijan Premier League.

Following the 2013–14 Azerbaijan Cup final, Yuri Semin left the club. On 14 June 2014, Gabala announced Dorinel Munteanu as their new manager, on a one-year contract. On 8 December 2014, Munteanu was relieved of his duties as manager, following four wins in sixteen matches. Sanan Gurbanov was put in temporary charge following the departure of Munteanu, with Roman Hryhorchuk being announced as the club's new permanent manager following the club's 1–1 draw with Inter Baku on 21 December 2014.

Transfers

Summer

In:

Out:

Winter

In:

Out:

Squad

Out on loan

Friendlies

Competitions

Azerbaijan Premier League

Results summary

Results

League table

Azerbaijan Cup

UEFA Europa League

Qualifying rounds

Squad statistics

Appearances and goals

|-
|colspan="14"|Players away from Gabala on loan:
|-
|colspan="14"|Players who appeared for Gabala no longer at the club:

|}

Goal scorers

Disciplinary record

Notes 

Qarabağ have played their home games at the Tofiq Bahramov Stadium since 1993 due to the ongoing situation in Quzanlı.
Araz-Naxçıvan were excluded from the Azerbaijan Premier League on 17 November 2014, with all their results being annulled.

References

External links 
Gabala FC Website
Gabala FC at UEFA.com
Gabala FC at Soccerway.com
Gabala FC at National Football Teams.com

Gabala FC seasons
Gabala